Jean Smith (born 1959) is a Canadian musician.

Jean Smith may also refer to:

Jean Smith (baseball) (1928–2011), American baseball player
Jean Edward Smith (1932–2019), American biographer and academic
Jean Kennedy Smith (1928–2020), American diplomat
Jean Chandler Smith (1918–1999), American librarian and bibliographer